Håvard Solås Taugbøl (born 20 August 1993) is a Norwegian cross-country skier.

He competed in four events at the 2011 European Youth Olympic Winter Festival, then three events at both the 2012 and 2013 Junior World Championships, winning a bronze and a silver medal in the relay.

He made his World Cup debut in December 2013 in the Davos sprint, also collecting his first World Cup points with a 21st place. In his next World Cup outing, in March 2014, he finished 11th in the Lahti sprint. In 2014–15 he improved to a 7th place in December 2014 in Davos and 4th place in March 2015 in Lahti, both in sprints.

He represents the sports club Lillehammer SK.

Cross-country skiing results
All results are sourced from the International Ski Federation (FIS).

Olympic Games

Distance reduced to 30 km due to weather conditions.

World Championships
1 medal – (1 bronze)

World Cup

Season standings

Individual podiums
 1 victory – (1 ) 
 5 podiums – (5 )

Team podiums
2 podiums – (2 )

References

External links
 
 
 
 

1993 births
Living people
Sportspeople from Lillehammer
Norwegian male cross-country skiers
FIS Nordic World Ski Championships medalists in cross-country skiing
Cross-country skiers at the 2022 Winter Olympics
Olympic cross-country skiers of Norway